Davide Bianchi (born 11 May 1996) is an Italian football player who plays as a right back.

Club career
He made his professional debut in the Serie B for Vicenza Calcio on 20 May 2016 in a game against Perugia.

After the bankruptcy of Vicenza Calcio, he was re-signed by their phoenix club L.R. Vicenza Virtus in July 2018.

On 19 August 2020 he signed with Mantova.

References

External links
 
 

1996 births
Living people
Sportspeople from Mantua
Footballers from Lombardy
Italian footballers
Association football defenders
Serie B players
Serie C players
L.R. Vicenza players
Mantova 1911 players